Slovenia competed in the 2010 Summer Youth Olympics in Singapore.

Medalists

Archery

Boys

Girls

Mixed Team

Athletics

Boys
Track and Road Events

Field Events

Girls
Track and Road Events

Field Events

Canoeing

Boys

Girls

Cycling

Cross Country

Time Trial

BMX

Road Race

Overall

 * Received -5 for finishing road race with all three racers

Judo

Individual

Rowing

Sailing

One Person Dinghy

Swimming

Triathlon

Girls

Mixed

Table tennis

Individual

Team

References

External links

Competitors List: Slovenia

2010 in Slovenian sport
Nations at the 2010 Summer Youth Olympics
Slovenia at the Youth Olympics